Giddey is a surname. Notable people with the surname include:

Josh Giddey (born 2002), Australian basketball player
Warrick Giddey (born 1967), Australian basketball coach and former player

See also
Giddy (surname)
Gidey, surname